Second Nature: A Gardener's Education was Michael Pollan's first book.  It is a collection of essays about gardening arranged by seasons.

It is listed in the American Horticultural Society's 75 Great American Garden Books.

In the book, Pollan describes the relationship between the wild and gardens, nature vs. cultivation, and nature vs. chemicals. He discusses the difficulty of raising roses, which have become so specialized that they can no longer survive in the wild.

References

External links
Second Nature, from Michael Pollan website.

1992 non-fiction books
Books by Michael Pollan
Gardening books
Atlantic Monthly Press books
American essay collections